Oxifentorex (INN) is an amphetamine described as an anorectic which does not appear to have ever been marketed.

References

Substituted amphetamines
Anorectics
Norepinephrine-dopamine releasing agents
Stimulants
Amine oxides